Henry Hill (29 November 1858 – 14 August 1935) was an English amateur first-class cricketer, who played fourteen matches for Yorkshire County Cricket Club between 1888 and 1891.

Born in Thornhill, Dewsbury, Yorkshire, England, Hill was a right-handed batsman, he scored 337 runs at 13.48 with a best score of 34 against the Australians.  He also took 10 catches.

He captained the Dewsbury and Savile club for many years, and served as the Dewsbury representative on the Yorkshire Committee up to his death. He died in Headingley, Leeds, Yorkshire in August 1935.

References

General
Cricinfo Profile

1858 births
1935 deaths
Yorkshire cricketers
Cricketers from Dewsbury
English cricketers
English cricketers of 1864 to 1889
English cricketers of 1890 to 1918